Gajapati district is a district of Odisha State in  India. It was created from Ganjam District on 2 October, 1992. Gajapati district was named after Krushna Chandra Gajapati Narayan Deb, the King of the Paralakhemundi estate and the first Prime Minister of Orissa, who is remembered for his contribution in the formation of a separate state, and inclusion of his estate in Odisha. The district headquarters at Paralakhemundi, formerly a Zamindari, has been clustered within a radius of approximately 5 kilometers around the geometric centre of Paralakhemundi.  The District is a part of the Red Corridor.
As of 2011 it is the third least populous district of Odisha (out of 30), after Debagarh and Boudh.

History
The history of Gajapati district goes back to the Paralakhemundi kingdom. It was part of the Gajapati Kingdom of Odisha. During the 12th century CE Parala Khemundi was part of the Khemundi state. During the reign of Mukunda Dev Khemundi was trifurcated creating 3 states Bada Khemundi, Sana Khemundi and Paralakhemundi. After the trifurcation, Subhalinga Bhanu became the ruler of the Paralakhemundi. This line of kings continued to rule Paralakhemundi throughout the Mughal Maratha rule of Odisha. Before the British completed control of Odisha, Parala became a feudal state of British Raj during the reign of Gajapati Jagannatha Narayanadev in 1767. The state had some conflict with the British administrators. The king Gajapati Jagannatha Narayanadev and his son was arrested by the British. The state then came under direct British supervision. There was a revolt among the tribals and Paikas of the state against the King's detention. Due to this, the King was reinstated to his position. 

Paralakhemundi remained under the administration as a feudatory state until its unification with Odisha.
One of the prominent kings of Parala was Krushna Chandra Gajapati. He was an active member of Utkal Sammilani and was instrumental in creating the separate state for Odisha. Finally, with the effort of Maharaja Krushna Chandra Gajapati and Utkal Sammilani, the separate state of United Odisha was formed on 1 April 1936. The state of Paralkhemundi in Vizagapatam district was partitioned into two – with the capital and most of the princely state coming under Orissa and the remaining Telugu-speaking areas remained under Madras Presidency. In 1937, the first Governor of Odisha, Sir John Austin Hubback invited Krushna Chandra Gajapati Dev to form the cabinet. Shri Gajapati was the first Prime Minister of the Odisha state from 1 April 1937 to 18 July 1937. He was the Prime Minister of Odisha for the second time from 24 November 1941 to 30 June 1944.

Geography

Gajapati district located at the south-east of Odisha between longitude 84° 32'E and 83° 47'E and latitude 18° 44'N and 19° 39'N. The Mahendratanaya River flows through it. The district borders with Andhra Pradesh in the south, District of Rayagada to west, District of Ganjam to East and District of Kandhamala to the North. The district is located on a hilly terrain of Eastern Ghats. The mountain Mahendragiri, a segment of Eastern Ghats is situated in this district.

The climate is subtropical with high humidity. Summer season is between March to mid-June and is extremely hot with the temperature reaching 46 °C. Winter season is mild and temperature can fall lowest to 9 °C  November to February. The rainy season lasts between mid-June to mid-October and it receives approximately 1000 mm of rainfall primarily from the southwest monsoons.

Administration
Gajapati District is sparsely populated and hence consists of only one subdivision, Paralakhemundi. The district is further divided into seven Blocks.

 Gumma
 Kashinagar
 Mohana
 Nuagada
 Goshani
 R.Udayagiri
 Rayagada

There are 149 Gram Panchayats consisting of 1,534 inhabited villages in the district.

The town Paralakhemundi is the District Headquarters and also the largest town of the Gajapati district. Kashinagara is the second largest town of Gajapati district.

Economy
In 2006 the Ministry of Panchayati Raj named Gajapati one of the country's 250 most backward districts (out of a total of 640). It is one of the 19 districts in odisha currently receiving funds from the Backward Regions Grant Fund Programme (BRGF).

Demographics

According to the 2011 census Gajapati district has a population of 577,817, approximate equal to the nation of Cape Verde or the US state of Wyoming. This gives it a ranking of 533rd in India (out of a total of 640).
Its population growth rate over the decade 2001-2011 was 10.99%. Gajapati has a sex ratio of 1042 females for every 1000 males, and a literacy rate of 54.29%. Scheduled Castes and Scheduled Tribes make up 6.78% and 54.29% of the population respectively.

Language

At the time of the 2011 Census of India, 41.51% of the population in the district spoke Odia, 34.49% Sora, 15.53% Telugu, 5.54% Kui and 1.25% Kuvi as their first language.

Culture 
The mountain Mahendragiri, a segment of Eastern Ghats is situated in Paralakhemundi. Legend says that it is the place where lord Parashurama, a Chiranjeevi staying eternally and doing tapasya. Temples built by Pandavas are seen. Main festival here is Shivaratri, the worship of Shiva, the guru or percepter of lord Parashurama.

Education

Colleges
 S. K. C. G. Autonomous College, Paralakhemundi
 Women's College, Paralakhemundi
 Sanskrit College, Paralakhemundi
 Centurion School for Rural Enterprise Management
 Centurion University of Technology and Management(CUTM)
 Gajapati College of Pharmacy
 Gajapati College of Nursing
 Gajapati School of Nursing

Schools
 Maha Raja's Boys High School (MRBHS)
 Maha Raja's Girls High School (MRGHS)
 Jawahar Navodaya Vidyalaya (JNV)
 Kendriya Vidyalaya (KV)
 Centurion Public School (CPS)

Politics

The district sends two representatives to state legislature, Odisha Vidhan Sabha. The following is the two Vidhan sabha constituencies of Gajapati district and the elected members of those areas.

The district is part of Berhampur (Lok Sabha constituency). The MP of Berhampur is Chandra Sekhar Sahu from the BJD.

Media

 GTV
 CHANNEL 3

References

External links

 

 
Populated places established in 1992
Minority Concentrated Districts in India
1992 establishments in Orissa
Districts of Odisha